"The Road Less Traveled" is the thirty-first episode and the twelfth episode of the second season (1986–87) of the television series The Twilight Zone. In this episode, a draft dodger is haunted by visions of the Vietnam War he evaded going to.

Plot
A young girl named Megan tells her parents a man is in her room, but they do not believe her. When her father Jeff puts her back into bed, he has a brief but vivid hallucination of the Vietnam War. Jeff is plagued by guilt over his having evaded the Vietnam-era draft by moving to Canada.

The next day, Megan claims that the man is upstairs and talked to her. Her mother, Denise, sees the man Megan spoke about and screams for Jeff. Jeff goes upstairs to investigate, walks into the bathroom and experiences another vision of Vietnam, but this time with him fully transported into the vision as a U.S. soldier.

Jeff hypothesizes that the man is someone who died because Jeff was not in Vietnam. Denise assures him that they will face the problem together, but frightened by another vision, Jeff runs outside, gets into his car and drives away. Later, Denise gets a call from Jeff, who sounds odd and begs her to come home. Jeff arrives at Denise's workplace asking for her, discovering that someone sounding like him called and asked her to come home. Jeff goes home and finds Denise with a man in a wheelchair. He realizes the man is himself, from a different reality where he honored his draft and went to Vietnam. Vietnam Jeff explains that he wanted to see what his life would have been like if he had not enlisted. He rejects Other Jeff's sentiment that he should have been in Vietnam, revealing that because he went to Vietnam, Denise died in a motorcycle accident while he was gone and Megan never existed. At Other Jeff's insistence, he and Vietnam Jeff touch to share each other's memories so that Vietnam Jeff can experience the good life at the cost of Other Jeff experiencing the Vietnam War. Vietnam Jeff regains the use of his legs and then disappears, leaving Other Jeff with Denise and Megan.

Production
The illusion that actor Cliff DeYoung had lost both legs in the Vietnam War branch of reality was accomplished with a mirror placed under his wheelchair.

The episode as originally produced had a running time of 45 minutes. It had to be cut down to 24 minutes when CBS cut the broadcast time for The Twilight Zone from one-hour to a half-hour. The DVD releases include the excised footage.

References

External links
 
 Postcards from the Zone episode The Road Less Traveled

1986 American television episodes
The Twilight Zone (1985 TV series season 2) episodes
Television episodes about Vietnam War
Television episodes about parallel universes
Television episodes written by George R. R. Martin

fr:J'étais au Canada